Management development is the process by which managers learn and improve their management skills.

Background 
In organisational development, management effectiveness is recognized as a determinant of organisational success. Therefore, investment in management development can have a direct economic benefit to the organisation. In 2004, the money spent per year per manager on management and leadership development was £1,035, an average of 6.3 days per manager.

Approaches to management development 
 Dysfunction analysis
 Mentoring
 Coaching
 Job rotation
 Professional development
 Business workflow analysis
 Upward feedback
 Executive education
 Supervisory training

Purpose of management development 

Managers are an integral part of the decision-making processes of organizations. Therefore, management development is a crucial factor in improving their performance. A management development program may help reduce employee turnover, improve employee satisfaction, better able a company to track manager performance, improve managers' people management skills, improve management productivity and morale, and prepare managers for technological change.

Action learning 
Many management qualifications now have an action learning element. Action learning asserts that individuals learn best from hands-on experience.

Coaching 

Coaching is a teaching, training or development process in which an individual is supported while achieving a specific personal or professional result or goal. Coaching is an effective learning tool that affects the bottom line and productivity, as well as intangible benefits. It aids in the improvement of individual performance, tackles underperformance, and aids in the identification of personal learning needs.

Management education 
One of the biggest growth areas in UK education since the early 1980s has been the growth of university-level management education. In addition to weekly part-time attendance at college/university, many students employ distance learning. The number of UK business schools grew from two in the early 1970s, to over one hundred providers.

Management development programme 
Management development programmes (MDP) are conducted by big corporates and management institutes in order to enable current and prospective managers to develop an understanding of management concepts, practices, approaches and perspectives. The participants gain an immersive learning experience and are encouraged to provide insights on situational problems and are exposed to the views of other participants of their group. Through this process, they gain problem solving skills and analytical thinking ability.

See also 
 Chartered Institute of Personnel and Development
 Chartered Management Institute
 Institute of Leadership & Management
 Leadership development
 Training & Development

References 

Human resource management